The 1991 Kent Cup was an invitational non-ranking snooker tournament held at the Yuetan Stadium in Beijing from 21 to 24 March 1991. Joe Swail won the event, defeating Marcus Campbell 5–0 in the final, and received £5,000 prize money.

Main draw
Group matches were decided on the aggregate score across two . The scores in points are shown. Players in bold denote match winners.

Group A

Group B
Each player won one match. Leung qualified as the player that made the highest break in the group.

Group C

Group D

Knockout

References

Kent Cup (snooker)
Kent Cup
Kent Cup